John Benjamin Brandeberry (December 13, 1893 – September 23, 1953) was an engineering professor and American football player and coach. He was the first head football coach at the University of Toledo, serving for one season, in 1917, and compiling a record of 0–3.

Head coaching record

References

External links
 

1893 births
1953 deaths
Mount Union Purple Raiders football players
Toledo Rockets football coaches
University of Toledo faculty
People from Wood County, Ohio
Players of American football from Ohio